Murraydale is a locality located in the 'Central' Ward of the Rural City of Swan Hill, Victoria, Australia. A post office opened in Murraydale on 4 December 1916 and was closed on 30 June 1969.

References

Towns in Victoria (Australia)
Rural City of Swan Hill